Maria Adeline Alice Schweistal or Fanny Psicha (1864-1950) was a Belgium born Dutch artist. She was known for her still lifes.

Biography 
Schweistal was born on 9 April 1864 in Brussels, Belgium, settling in Amsterdam in  1886. She attended the Rijksakademie van beeldende kunsten in Amsterdam. She studied with August Allebé, Hendrik Adriaan Christiaan Dekker, Hendrik Haverman, and Marie Wandscheer. Her work was included in the 1939 exhibition and sale Onze Kunst van Heden (Our Art of Today) at the Rijksmuseum in Amsterdam. She exhibited regularly from 1911 through 1940 with the Sint Lucas group.

Schweistal died on 7 June 1950 in Amsterdam.

Gallery

References

External links

1864 births
1950 deaths
Artists from Brussels
20th-century Belgian women artists